Clemensia is a genus of moths in the family Erebidae. The genus was described by Packard in 1864.

Species

References

 , 1983: Description de nouvelles Lithosiinae de la Guyana Française (Lepidoptera: Arctiidae). Annales de la Société Entomologique de France 19 (1): 69–78.
 ;  2010: Annotated check list of the Noctuoidea (Insecta, Lepidoptera) of North America north of Mexico. ZooKeys, 40: 1–239.

External links

Cisthenina
Moth genera